Adi Soffer (born January 21, 1987) is an Israeli footballer currently playing for Hapoel Herzliya.

Honours
Liga Leumit
2013-14

References

External links
 

1987 births
Living people
Israeli footballers
Maccabi Herzliya F.C. players
Hapoel Afula F.C. players
Hapoel Ashkelon F.C. players
Maccabi Netanya F.C. players
Hapoel Jerusalem F.C. players
Hapoel Ramat Gan F.C. players
Hapoel Herzliya F.C. players
Liga Leumit players
Israeli Premier League players
Footballers from Herzliya
Israeli people of Turkish-Jewish descent
Association football midfielders
Association football fullbacks